B-Step Sequencer is a multitrack software MIDI step sequencer that is available as either a standalone application or in audio plug-in format (VST and Audio Units). Primarily used to create melodical sequences to trigger soft or hardware synthesizer, whether in a studio environment or live on stage, it has a user interface based on pattern and TR music sequencers.

History 
The first version of B-Step Sequencer (1.0), developed by the German company Monoplugs, was released in December 2013 for Microsoft Windows, Mac OS X and Linux. In March 2014 Monoplugs released the B-Step Sequencer for iPad, providing the same functionality as for desktop computers. Version 2.0 was released in October 2014 with two new supported platforms: Android and Raspbian (Raspberry Pi).

Features 
B-Step Sequencer has a long list of features, including full MIDI and MIDI beat clock sync support, Sequencer Ratcheting, shuffle (swing), monophonic and polyphonic note playback modes.

User Interface 
The user interface, which looks clean and is contrast rich, is designed for live performances without any need for a deep menu hierarchy. It shows all the important settings on the main interface and features drag and drop to copy settings on the fly.

Specification 
 16 steps per track
 4 tracks per pattern
 16 patterns
 playback of up to 4 patterns at the same time
 5x MIDI out for synthesizer control
 sends and receives MIDI CC (trainable)
 2x MIDI in and out for Novation Launchpad controllers
 1x MIDI in and out for trainable MIDI controllers
 MIDI THRU (optional)
 MIDI beat clock thru (optional)
 1x MIDI in for MIDI beat clock sync

Editions

Standalone 
B-Step Sequencer Standalone currently runs with recent versions of Windows (WinMM MIDI), Mac OS X (Core MIDI), Linux (ALSA MIDI), iPad (Core MIDI), Android (MIDI via USB) and Raspberry Pi (ALSA MIDI).

VST Plug-in 
As a VST plug-in B-Step Sequencer can be used in well-known VST hosts like Ableton Live, Cubase, Bitwig, REAPER or Renoise. The VST version is available for 32-bit and native 64-bit CPU architectures on Linux, Microsoft Windows and Mac OS X.

Audio Units Plug-in 
On Mac OS X B-Step Sequencer can be run as an Audio Units plug-in in Audio Units hosts like Logic Pro.

Versions 
B-Step Sequencer is available as either a trial (demo) or a commercial version. The trial version excludes saving of user projects and is time limited to 30 minutes. After application restart or unloading it in the plug-in host it is possible to use it again for 30 minutes. The commercial version is not time limited and it has the project save feature available.

Support 
Support for B-Step Sequencer is provided through a HTML user manual. Users may also register for the official Monoplugs forum or contact Monoplugs directly.

References 

 "B-Step Sequencer 2 Pro – A deep sequencer from Monoplugs." Review by iOS MARS, November 12, 2014.
 "B-Step Sequencer v.2 – MonoPlugs announce new version of step-based MIDI sequencer for iOS." Preview by MUSIC APP BLOG, August 11, 2014.
 ""it's bigger on the inside": Monoplugs B-Step Sequencer" Review by SynMag Nr.45, middle of July 2014
 "B-Step Sequencer iPad App" Review by Synth Universe, June 10, 2014

External links 
 Official B-Step Sequencer Website (archived copy)
 Official Monoplugs Website
 B-Step Sequencer Tutorial Videos

Music sequencers